The 1968 All-Ireland Senior Football Championship was the 82nd staging of the All-Ireland Senior Football Championship, the Gaelic Athletic Association's premier inter-county Gaelic football tournament. The championship began on 21 April 1968 and ended on 22 September 1968.

Meath entered the championship as the defending champions, however, they were defeated by Longford in the Leinster semi-final.

On 22 September 1968, Down won the championship following a 2-12 to 1-13 defeat of Kerry in the All-Ireland final. This was their third All-Ireland title and their first in seven championship seasons.

Down's Paddy Doherty was the championship's top scorer with 1-25. His teammate Seán O'Neill was the choice for Texaco Footballer of the Year.

Results

Connacht Senior Football Championship

Quarter-final

Semi-finals

Final

Leinster Senior Football Championship

First round

Second round

Quarter-finals

Semi-finals

Final

Munster Senior Football Championship

Quarter-finals

Semi-finals

Final

Ulster Senior Football Championship

Preliminary round

Quarter-finals

Semi-finals

Final

All-Ireland Senior Football Championship

Semi-finals

Final

Championship statistics

Top scorers

Overall

Single game

Miscellaneous
 Longford win their first ever Leinster football title.
 The All-Ireland semi-final between Kerry and Longford is the first ever championship meeting between the two teams.

References